The W3C Technical Architecture Group (TAG) is a special working group within the World Wide Web Consortium (W3C) created in 2001 to:

 to document and build consensus around principles of Web architecture and to interpret and clarify these principles when necessary;
 to resolve issues involving general Web architecture brought to the TAG;
 to help coordinate cross-technology architecture developments inside and outside W3C.

The TAG consists of inventor of the Web and W3C director Sir Tim Berners-Lee, engineers elected by W3C member organizations, as well as participants directly appointed by Tim Berners-Lee.

Role and deliverables 
Today, the TAG's primary responsibilities are two-fold:

 to conduct specification reviews ("design reviews") of new Web platform features, to ensure API design consistency, and respect for web users' security and privacy
 to document the design principles of the Web platform, which is done in the Web Platform Design Principles document, the Ethical Web Principles document as well as various separate "Findings" documents. Notable past publications include Architecture of the World Wide Web, volume one (2004) 

Google requires an approving TAG review for a Web platform feature to ship in Blink, Google Chrome's rendering engine. An approving review is also required for a W3C draft specification to be able to become a Recommendation.

While the TAG is a W3C working group, design reviews are not limited to W3C specifications. The TAG is often asked to review TC39, WHATWG, or IETF specifications as well.

Participants 
The current participants (as of December 2021) are:

 Daniel Appelquist (Samsung Electronics) (Chair)
 Rossen Atanassov (Microsoft Corporation)
 Hadley Beeman (W3C Invited Expert)
 Tim Berners-Lee (W3C) (Chair)
 Kenneth Rohde Christiansen (Intel Corporation)
 Amy Guy (Digital Bazaar)
 Yves Lafon (W3C) (staff contact)
 Peter Linss (W3C Invited Expert) (Chair)
 Sangwhan Moon (Google)
 Theresa O'Connor (Apple, Inc.)
 Lea Verou (W3C Invited Expert)

Despite some participants having a corporate affiliation, when participating in TAG meetings they are expected to act in their personal capacity to find the best solutions for the Web, not just for any particular network, technology, vendor, or user.

Notable past participants include:

 Roy Fielding
 Chris Lilley
 Tim Bray
 Dan Connolly
 Mario Jeckle
 T.V. Raman
 Larry Masinter
 Jeni Tennison
 Robin Berjon
 Anne van Kesteren
 Yan Zhu
 David Baron

History

2012 Reform 
During its first decade, the TAG had a very different role and responsibilities than what it does today.

The primary focus of the first three years of the TAG was on documenting in a clear and easily understood manner the architectural foundations of the Web. The result was published at the end of 2004 as Architecture of the World Wide Web, Volume One. It is written in a relatively informal style, with illustrations, and many of its conclusions are expressed in succinct 'principles', 'constraints' and 'good practice notes', such as:

 Principle: Global Identifiers Global naming leads to global network effects.
 Good practice: Identify with URIs To benefit from and increase the value of the World Wide Web, agents should provide URIs as identifiers for resources.
 Constraint: URIs Identify a Single Resource Assign distinct URIs to distinct resources.

After this publication and until 2012, the work of the TAG primarily resulted in publishing Findings documents, centered around XML, RDF, and URIs.

In 2012, four prominent web developers felt that the TAG had become disconnected from the realities and pain points of web developers. Led by Alex Russell, they dubbed themselves "the reformers" and participated in the 2012 TAG election for four vacant seats. All of them got elected. It was only after this reform that design reviews of new specifications became a significant part of the TAG's work and the process for requesting a design review moved to GitHub and became streamlined.

First Party Sets Controversy 
In February 2019, Google requested a TAG design review of their First Party Sets proposal as required per their shipping policy. The proposal was rejected by the TAG in 2021. The group's review concluded that "the First Party Sets proposal harmful to the web in its current form". This resulted in Google updating its timeline for removing third-party cookies and postponing it to 2023.

This follows earlier public statements by the TAG about prioritizing user security and privacy when conducting design reviews.

References 

Working groups
World Wide Web Consortium